Liberty Township is one of sixteen townships in Buchanan County, Iowa, USA.  As of the 2000 census, its population was 1,133.

Geography 

According to the USGS, it contains four cemeteries: Hickory Grove, Pine Creek, Quasqueton and Saint Patricks.

History
Liberty Township was first organized in 1847 at which time it was much larger than at present. It was reduced to its present size in 1858.

References

External links 

 US-Counties.com
 City-Data.com

Townships in Buchanan County, Iowa
Townships in Iowa
1847 establishments in Iowa